Robert (Bob) Curtis Memorial Airport  is a state-owned public-use airport located one nautical mile (1.8 km) north of the central business district of Noorvik, a village in the Northwest Arctic Borough of the U.S. state of Alaska.

As per Federal Aviation Administration records, this airport had 6,523 passenger boardings (enplanements) in calendar year 2007, a decrease of 5% from the 6,884 enplanements in 2006.

Facilities 
It has one runway (6/24) with a gravel surface measuring 4,000 by 100 feet (1,219 by 30 m).

Airlines and destinations

References

External links
 FAA Alaska airport diagram (GIF)

Airports in Northwest Arctic Borough, Alaska
Airports in the Arctic